Last of the Renegades ( and also known as Winnetou: Last of the Renegades) is a 1964 German-Italian Western film directed by Harald Reinl and starring Pierre Brice, Lex Barker, and Anthony Steel. It is based on a Karl May novel, and was part of a series of adaptations produced by Rialto Film. The film is a sequel to Apache Gold.

Cast

Production
It was shot at the Spandau Studios in Berlin and on location in Croatia. The film's sets were designed by the art director Vladimir Tadej.

It was one of a number of films Anthony Steel made in Europe.

Reception

Box office
In West Germany, it was the fourth top-grossing film of 1964, selling  tickets. In the Soviet Union, the film sold  tickets. This adds up to a total of  tickets sold worldwide.

See also
 Karl May film adaptations
 Klaus Kinski filmography

References

Bibliography

External links
 
 Last of the Renegades at filmportal.de/en

1964 films
1964 Western (genre) films
1960s buddy films
1960s historical films
Constantin Film films
Films directed by Harald Reinl
Films produced by Horst Wendlandt
Films set in New Mexico
Films set in the 19th century
Films shot at Spandau Studios
Films shot in Croatia
Films shot in Slovenia
Films shot in Yugoslavia
French Western (genre) films
German Western (genre) films
German historical films
German sequel films
1960s German-language films
Italian Western (genre) films
Italian historical films
Italian sequel films
1960s Italian-language films
Spaghetti Western films
West German films
Winnetou films
1960s Italian films
1960s German films
Foreign films set in the United States